Jerzy Maciej Kossak (Kraków, 11 September 1886 – 11 May 1955, Kraków) was a Polish realist painter specializing in military scenes. He was the son of painter Wojciech Kossak and grandson of painter Juliusz Kossak, a third-generation artist from a well-known and sought after family of painters, writers and poets.

Artist

Jerzy Kossak was a prolific painter of mostly historic scenes featuring the famed Polish Uhlans on horses, usually sold on the spot, but also used for barter at times of the postwar economic slump, until his death before the end of Stalinism in Poland. His paintings, along with those of his ancestors, remain among the best-selling at Polish art auctions.

Personal life

Jerzy Kossak was a brother of the poet Maria Pawlikowska-Jasnorzewska and of the novelist Magdalena Samozwaniec, as well as the father of biologist Simona Kossak and of painter Gloria Kossak. He resides at the historic family manor called "Kossakówka", in metropolitan Kraków.

He was married twice, first to Ewa Kossakowa (née Kaplińska), by whom he had two daughters, (one called Maria, born 1917), and then to Elżbieta Dzięciołowska-Śmiałowska, who was the mother of  Simona and Gloria.

See also
Zofia Kossak-Szczucka (1889–1968), daughter of Tadeusz Kossak, the twin brother of Jerzy's father
Kossak family; 4 generations of notable painters, writers and poets
List of Poles

References

 Art of Jerzy Kossak at the online gallery pinakoteka.zascianek.pl including short biography and publications in the Polish language

1886 births
1955 deaths
Artists from Kraków
People from the Kingdom of Galicia and Lodomeria
19th-century Polish painters
19th-century Polish male artists
20th-century Polish painters
20th-century Polish male artists
World War II artists
Polish war artists
Polish male painters